The 1981 Arab Athletics Championships was the third edition of the international athletics competition between Arab countries. It took place in Tunis, Tunisia from 21–24 August. It was the first occasion that the tournament was hosted in Africa. A total of 39 athletics events were contested, 23 for men and 16 for women. The men's 20 kilometres walk was held for the first time – being the first Arab walking championship race since the 1965 Pan Arab Games. The women's programme, following its debut in 1979 with ten events, was greatly expanded. Relays, hurdles, heptathlon and distance events were all opened up to women athletes.

Medal summary

Men

Women

 A third team, from South Yemen, was disqualified in the women's race 4×400 m relay.

Medal table

Overall

Men

Women

References

Results
 Al Batal Al Arabi (N°:7). Arab Athletics Union. Retrieved on 2015-02-14.

Arab Athletics Championships
International athletics competitions hosted by Tunisia
Sport in Tunis
Arab Athletics Championships
Arab Athletics Championships
Arab Athletics Championships, 1981
Arab Athletics Championships